Victor Cădere (1891–1980) was a Romanian jurist, administrator and diplomat. Born in Buhalnița, Neamț County, he got a doctorate in law.

He was member or the Romanian delegation to the Peace Conference in Paris in 1919 and head of the Romanian Military Mission to the Far East (1920–1921). He was also professor at the Law Faculty of the Cluj University. Under the reign of King Carol II of Romania, he also was secretary general of the Interior Ministry and royal resident of Ţinutul Dunării.

As diplomat he was minister plenipotentiary of Romania to Warsaw (1931–1935), Belgrade and Lisbon.
  
Between 1933 and 1934 he was the president of FIDAC (The Interallied Federation of War Veterans Organisations).
 
Under the communist regime he was arrested on October 7, 1952 and accused of espionage. Incarcerated at Jilava prison and Sighet prison, he was tried only in 1956 by a Military Court, being sentenced to 5 years of imprisonment, but was released on September 20, 1956.

Being able to leave Romania he worked as Associate Professor of the Paris University.  Victor Cădere was corresponding member of the Institut de France.

References

Fişe de întemniţare: ÎPS Bartolomeu şi părintele Boilă – Ziua de Cluj, July 24, 2008 
 Ubcluj – Scurt istoric 
 Tatiana Pokivailova – Septembrie – Decembrie . Contacte româno-britanice pe masa lui Stalin 
 89 lat dyplomacji Rumunia-Polska 

1891 births
1980 deaths
Diplomats from Cluj-Napoca
Romanian jurists
Inmates of Sighet prison